José Marcelo Januário de Araújo (6 May 1972 – 31 October 2018), commonly known as Esquerdinha, was a Brazilian footballer who played as a left back.

Esquerdinha scored in the first leg of the 1999 Supertaça Cândido de Oliveira which Porto would go on to win 5–2 on aggregate.

He died on 31 October 2018, in Cruz das Armas, a neighborhood in João Pessoa, Paraíba, Brazil from a heart attack after playing football with friends.

References

External links
 
 

1972 births
2018 deaths
Sportspeople from Rio Grande do Sul
Brazilian footballers
Association football defenders
Botafogo Futebol Clube (PB) players
Sport Club Corinthians Alagoano players
Campeonato Brasileiro Série A players
Esporte Clube Bahia players
Fluminense FC players
Esporte Clube Vitória players
Primeira Liga players
FC Porto players
La Liga players
Real Zaragoza players
Associação Académica de Coimbra – O.A.F. players
Goiás Esporte Clube players
Expatriate footballers in Portugal
Brazilian expatriate sportspeople in Portugal
Expatriate footballers in Spain
Brazilian expatriate sportspeople in Spain